"Monster" is a song recorded by American rock band Imagine Dragons for the soundtrack to the 2013 action role-playing game Infinity Blade III. It is the band's fifth appearance on a soundtrack. The song was also included on the band’s second studio album, Smoke + Mirrors

Background
"Monster", like all of Imagine Dragons' appearances on soundtracks, is a brand new song written specifically for the soundtrack, this time in collaboration with Chair Entertainment for their 2013 title, Infinity Blade III. It is used in-game, for the final cutscene and when the player equipes the "Imagine Dragon" weapon. Speaking of the song, the band stated: "Chair has always been on the cutting edge of mobile gaming. Infinity Blade has been massive and we felt the song fit perfectly with the tone and visuals. We're pretty big gamers ourselves, so we couldn't be more excited."

Track listing

Personnel
Adapted from the "Monster" single.

Imagine Dragons
Dan Reynolds – vocals
Wayne Sermon – acoustic guitar, backing vocals, keyboards, electric guitar
Ben McKee – bass guitar, backing vocals, synthesizer
Daniel Platzman – drums, viola

Additional personnel
Alex Da Kid – producer

Charts

Certifications

Release history

In popular culture
 The song was featured in a trailer for the 2013 Ubisoft video game Assassin's Creed IV: Black Flag.
 The song was also featured in a promo video for the feud between Daniel Bryan and Triple H during the WWE pay-per-view WrestleMania XXX on April 6, 2014.

References

Imagine Dragons songs
2013 singles
Song recordings produced by Alex da Kid
Songs written by Alex da Kid
2013 songs
Interscope Records singles
Songs written by Wayne Sermon
Songs written by Dan Reynolds (musician)
Songs written by Daniel Platzman
Songs written by Ben McKee